The Tambach Museum is a museum located in Tambach, Kenya. It is located in the former District Commissioner's residence.

References

See also 
 List of museums in Kenya

Museums in Kenya
Elgeyo-Marakwet County
Museums established in 2012
Buildings and structures in Kenya
Tourist attractions in Kenya